Ituri is one of the 21 new provinces of the Democratic Republic of the Congo created in the 2015 repartitioning. Ituri, Bas-Uele, Haut-Uele, and Tshopo provinces are the result of the dismemberment of the former Orientale province.  Ituri was formed from the Ituri district whose town of Bunia was elevated to capital city of the new province.

Geography

The Ituri Rainforest is in this area. It is located northeast of the Ituri River and on the western side of Lake Albert. It has borders with Uganda and South Sudan.

Territories
Its five administrative territories are:

 Aru (6,740 km2)
 Djugu (8,184 km2) 
 Irumu (8,730 km2)
 Mahagi (5,221 km2) 
 Mambasa (36,783 km2)

Geography
Ituri is a region of high plateau (2000–5000 meters) that has a large tropical forest but also the landscape of savannah. The province has rare fauna, including the okapi, the national animal of the Congo. As for flora, an important species is Mangongo, whose leaves are used by the Mbuti to build their homes.

Economy
The Kilo-Moto gold mines are partly located in Ituri. In the beginning of the 21st century, petroleum reserves have been found by Heritage Oil and Tullow Oil on the shores of Lake Albert.

History

Ituri, as Kibali-Ituri, was a province of the DRC from 1962 to 1966. Prior to the adoption of the 2006 Constitution of the Democratic Republic of the Congo, the legal status of Ituri was a topic of some dispute. From the beginning of the Second Congo War in 1998, it was held by soldiers of the Uganda People's Defense Force (UPDF) and the Ugandan-backed Movement for Liberation faction of the Rally for Congolese Democracy (RCD-ML). In June 1999, the commander of UPDF forces in the DRC, Brig. Gen. James Kazini, ignored the protests of RCD-ML leaders and re-created the province of Kibali-Ituri out of the eastern section of the northeastern Orientale province. It is almost always referred to simply as Ituri. The creation of the new province under the political rivalry contributed to the start of the current Ituri conflict, which has caused thousands of deaths.  Most official cartographers did not include the new province, and those referring to it as a "province" rather than a "region" were sometimes viewed as having a pro-Uganda bias. With the new constitution, Ituri's status as a province was finally settled.

Approximate correspondence between historical and current province

Government

An Ituri Interim Administration was formed through the efforts of the Ituri Pacification Commission, a commission sponsored by the United Nations Organization Mission in Democratic Republic of the Congo (MONUC, abbreviation of the French name "Mission de l'Organisation des Nations Unies en République Démocratique du Congo") that was set up, after much initial delay, in 2003 after the pull-out of Ugandan troops from the district. It led to the creation of the Ituri Interim Assembly, which elected an administrator and an assembly chairperson; the current assembly chairperson is Petronille Vaweka, who is also the sole deputy for the district to the National Assembly in Kinshasa.

The Interim Assembly will be reconstituted or replaced by a provincial assembly under the 2006 constitution. An election for the governor and vice-governor will also be held, and the district will be re-created as a province of the DRC.

Presidents, later governors, of Kibali-Ituri from 1962-1966
  September 1962 - 28 December 1966 Jean Foster Manzikala

Governors of Ituri since 1999
 *1999* Adele Lotsoye Mugisa (appointed by James Kazini)
 December 1999 - early 2001 Ernest Uringi Padolo
 December 2001 - November 2002 Joseph Eneku
 February 2002 - 2003 Jean-Pierre Mulondo Lonpondo
 April 2003 – 2016 Emmanuel Leku Apuobo
 March 2016 – present Jefferson Abdalla

Demographics

The population is composed primarily of Alur, Hema, Lendu, Ngiti, Bira and Ndo-Okebo, with differing figures on which one of the groups constitutes the largest percentage of the population in the province. The Mbuti, a pygmy ethnic group, reside primarily in the Ituri forest near the Okapi Wildlife Reserve, although some Mbuti have been forced into urban areas by deforestation, over-hunting and violence.

See also
Effacer le tableau

References

Further reading 
 WOLTERS, S., 2005. Is Ituri on the Road to Stability? An update on the current security situation in the district. Pretoria: Institute for Security Studies.

External links 
 2006 map of Ituri district
 Cautious Calm Settles Over War-scarred Ituri Region, Michael Deibert, Inter Press Service, April 2008

 01
Provinces of the Democratic Republic of the Congo
Ituri conflict